Gurulba (Gürelbe) is a rural locality (a selo) in Ivolginsky District, Republic of Buryatia, Russia. The population was 2,707 as of 2010. There are 98 streets.

Geography 
Gurulba is located 30 km northeast of Ivolginsk (the district's administrative centre) by road. Khoytobeye is the nearest rural locality.

References 

Rural localities in Ivolginsky District